Pahada Ra Luha (English: Tears of mountain) is a 2015 Indian Sambalpuri language feature film directed by Sabyasachi Mohapatra. The film has won 63rd National Film Awards for Best Feature Film in Odia category.

Plot
The movie is based on industrialisation and subsequent displacement of Paraja tribals in Koraput district. The film deals with problems faced by the ethnic communities of Niyamgiri hills due to rampant mining and rebel activities.

Cast
 Lochani Bag
 Sarat Pujari
 Ashrumochan
 Ashok Mishra
 Swati Ray

Production
Principal photography of the film was started in 1990 but the director was forced to stop the shooting midway due to financial and uncertain reasons. The shooting of the film resumed in June 2015 with the cast unchanged. Due to a 25-year break, the director Sabyasachi made changes in the storyline, in an attempt to appeal to modern audiences. Some artists had passed away during these 25 years, but Sabyasachi decided to keep the scenes he had shot with them in the film. The film was shot in Koraput and Kalahandi district.

Awards

See also
 63rd National Film Awards

References

2015 films
2010s Odia-language films
Films directed by Sabyasachi Mohapatra